Bradworthy is a village and civil parish in Devon, England. The village is close to the site of the first wind turbines in Devon, erected in 2005. Bradworthy has the largest village square in England.  The civil parish is bordered by the Devon parishes Hartland, Woolfardisworthy, West Putford, Sutcombe, Holsworthy Hamlets, and Pancrasweek and the Cornish civil parishes Kilkhampton and Morwenstow.  Bradworthy village has a pub, a primary school, and an industrial estate.

The parish church of St John the Baptist dates from the 13th century and is a grade II* listed building.

Arthur Herbert Procter, a Victoria Cross recipient, was vicar of Bradworthy from 1963 to 1964.

References

External links

The Bradworthy Book
Bradworthy at GENUKI
About Bradworthy
Bradworthy community page

Villages in Devon
Civil parishes in Devon
Torridge District